The Siberut macaque (Macaca siberu) is a vulnerable species of macaque, which is endemic to Siberut Island in Indonesia. It was formerly considered conspecific with the Pagai Island macaque (M. pagensis) which is overall paler in color, but this arrangement was polyphyletic. Both were formerly considered subspecies of the southern pig-tailed macaque (M. nemestrina).

References

Siberut macaque
Primates of Indonesia
Mentawai Islands Regency
Vulnerable fauna of Asia
Siberut macaque